Mucronalia is a genus of very small parasitic sea snails, marine gastropod mollusks or micromollusks in the family Eulimidae.

This genus was first described in 1860 by Arthur Adams in his paper, "On some new genera and species of Mollusca from Japan".

These sea snails are thought to be parasitic on ophiuroids (brittle stars).

Species
Species within the genera Mucronalia include:

Mucronalia bicincta A. Adams, 1860 (Type taxon)
Mucronalia bizonula Melvill, 1906
Mucronalia bulimuloides Dall, 1927
Mucronalia epibathra Melvill, 1906
Mucronalia exilis A. Adams, 1862
Mucronalia exquisita G. B. Sowerby III, 1915
Mucronalia involuta Carpenter, 1865
Mucronalia lepida Melvill, 1906
Mucronalia mammillata Dall, 1927
Mucronalia ophiuraphila Habe, 1974
Mucronalia oxytenes Melvill, 1904
Mucronalia rosea Pease, 1860
Mucronalia trilineata Warén, 1980
Mucronalia variabilis Schepman, 1913

Taxon inquirendum
 Mucronalia interrupta (A. Adams, 1864)

Nomen nudum
 Mucronalia tumida Pease MS, Tryon, 1886

Species brought into synonymy
 Mucronalia aethria Melvill, 1918: synonym of Melanella aethria (Melvill, 1918)
 Mucronalia angulata Mandahl-Barth, 1949: synonym of Scalaribalcis angulata (Mandahl-Barth, 1949)
 Mucronalia birtsi Preston, 1904: synonym of Stilifer birtsi (Preston, 1904)
 Mucronalia capillastericola Minichev, 1970: synonym of Goodingia capillastericola (Minichev, 1970)
 Mucronalia cylindrica G. B. Sowerby III, 1900: synonym of Hypermastus cylindricus (G. B. Sowerby III, 1900)
 Mucronalia eburnea Schepman & Nierstrasz, 1909: synonym of Stilapex eburnea (Schepman & Nierstrasz, 1909)
 Mucronalia gigas Kuroda & Habe, 1950: synonym of Melanella teinostoma (A. Adams, 1854)
 Mucronalia gracilis Pease, 1867: synonym of Peasistilifer gracilis (Pease, 1867)
 Mucronalia lactea A. Adams, 1864: synonym of Hypermastus lacteus (A. Adams, 1864)
 Mucronalia leucophaes Tomlin & Schackleford, 1913: synonym of Echineulima leucophaes (Tomlin & Shackleford, 1913)
 Mucronalia nidorum Pilsbry, 1956: synonym of Sabinella troglodytes (Thiele, 1925)
 Mucronalia nitidula Pease, 1860: synonym of Peasistilifer nitidula (Pease, 1860)
 Mucronalia ovata Pease, 1861: synonym of Echineulima ovata (Pease, 1861)
 Mucronalia palmipedis Koehler & Vaney, 1913: synonym of Apicalia palmipedis (Koehler & Vaney, 1913)
 Mucronalia philippinarum G. B. Sowerby III, 1900: synonym of Echineulima philippinarum (G. B. Sowerby III, 1900)
 Mucronalia suava Dall, 1927: synonym of Mucronalia mammillata Dall, 1927
 Mucronalia subula A. Adams, 1864: synonym of Hypermastus subula (A. Adams, 1864)
 Mucronalia varicosa Schepman, 1909: synonym of Goodingia varicosa (Schepman, 1909)
 Mucronalia xanthias Watson, 1886: synonym of Pelycidion xanthias (Watson, 1888)

References

External links 

Eulimidae